Forest Mill railway station served the hamlet of Forestmill, Clackmannanshire, Scotland from 1850 to 1930 on the Stirling and Dunfermline Railway.

History 
The station opened as Kincardine on 28 August 1850 by the North British Railway. To the east was the goods yard. To the west was a coal yard which was served by a siding to the east. The station's name was changed to Forest Mill on 18 December 1893. It closed to passengers on 22 September 1930 but remained open for goods until 6 October 1979.

References

External links 

Disused railway stations in Clackmannanshire
Railway stations in Great Britain opened in 1850
Railway stations in Great Britain closed in 1930
Former North British Railway stations
1850 establishments in Scotland
1930 disestablishments in Scotland